The Fisheries Act is legislation enacted by the Parliament of Canada, governing the powers of government to regulate fisheries and fishing vessels. The act has been undergoing major regulatory revisions in recent years, including those attached to treaty rights of Miꞌkmaq in Atlantic Canada. The Minister designated under the Act is the Ministers of Fisheries, Oceans and the Canadian Coast Guard.

Legislative History 

Since confederation, the British North America Act established all coastal and inland fisheries as being under the jurisdiction of the federal level of government.

The statute likely existed even before Confederation in some pre-Confederation jurisdictions. Early copies of revised statutes had separate statutes governing fisheries, pilotage, the department of fisheries, lighthouses, and other marine affairs. The 1905 copy of the Revised Statutes of Canada has a copy of the Fisheries Act, the minister was empowered to appoint fisheries officers to oversee fisheries, enabled the Minister to create a licensing system for fishermen, broadly prohibited whaling with the exception of instances approved by the minister, statutorily banned seine nets for use in cod or mackerel fishing, established prohibitions on salmon and trout fishing by means of a closed season and banned use of swing nets in salmon fishing, protected salmon spawning zones, regulated lobster licenses, gave officials the authority to impound illegally caught fish, banning dams in fishing rivers except as approved by government or for eel weirs, banning using fish as fertilizer, banning certain types of materials from being disposed into waterways, creating a broad regulatory authority for the minister, and creating offences and penalties. The Act notably did separate out First Nations as being capable of being given special dispensation for spearfishing by the minister, a likely acknowledgment of treaty rights.

This early legislation resembled in many instances what a modern regulatory regime might look like, establishing details of geography, date, technology and others in law, instead of delegating such powers to be determined by the Minister through an Order in Council. 

The modern fisheries act has many of the same objectives, including preventing pollution, regulating harvesting seasons, licensing fishers, establishing the Indigenous framework for fishing, creating penalties, empowering officers, and giving the Minister authority to regulate. 

The regulations under the act are broad, and include regulations on ballast dumping, the experimental lakes area, marine mammals, wastewater effluent and aquaculture, in addition to more traditional things like regulating provincial fisheries, fish roe, registration of foreign fishing vessels and protecting certain fishing habitats. In general, regulations now take up much of the detail that was formerly enshrined in legislation.

Major changes were approved in 2019, focusing on improved permitting authority for the government, giving authority to regulate inland fisheries entirely through regulation and referencing biodiversity.

List of Regulations 
 Aboriginal Communal Fishing Licences Regulations 
 Alberta Fishery Regulations, 1998 
 Aquaculture Activities Regulations 
 Aquatic Invasive Species Regulations 
 Atlantic Fishery Regulations, 1985 
 Authorizations Concerning Fish and Fish Habitat Protection Regulations 
 Ballast Water Regulations 
 British Columbia Sport Fishing Regulations, 1996 
 Conditions for Making Regulations Under Subsection 36(5.2) of the Fisheries Act, Regulations Establishing 
 Deposit Out of the Normal Course of Events Notification Regulations 
 Dogfish Exemption Notice 
 Experimental Lakes Area Research Activities Regulations 
 Fish Toxicant Regulations 
 Fishery (General) Regulations 
 Foreign Vessel Fishing Regulations 
 Management of Contaminated Fisheries Regulations 
 Manitoba Fishery Regulations, 1987 
 Marine Mammal Regulations 
 Maritime Provinces Fishery Regulations 
 Meat and Poultry Products Plant Liquid Effluent Regulations 
 Metal and Diamond Mining Effluent Regulations 
 Newfoundland and Labrador Fishery Regulations 
 Northwest Territories Fishery Regulations 
 Ontario Fishery Regulations, 1989 
 Ontario Fishery Regulations, 2007 
 Order Declaring that the Wastewater Systems Effluent Regulations Do Not Apply in Quebec
 Order Designating the Minister of the Environment as the Minister Responsible for the Administration and Enforcement of Subsections 36(3) to (6) of the Fisheries Act
 Pacific Aquaculture Regulations 
 Pacific Fishery Management Area Regulations, 2007 
 Pacific Fishery Regulations, 1993
 Pacific Hake Exemption Notice
 Petroleum Refinery Liquid Effluent Regulations
 Potato Processing Plant Liquid Effluent Regulations
 Pulp and Paper Effluent Regulations
 Quebec Fishery Regulations, 1990
 Roe Herring Exemption Notice
 Saskatchewan Fishery Regulations, 1995
 Wastewater Systems Effluent Regulations
 Wastewater Systems Effluent Regulations Do Not Apply in Yukon, Order Declaring that the
 Yukon Territory Fishery Regulations

Controversy and Policy Debates

2019 Reforms 
The 2019 law saw significant debate in parliament, including proposed Senate amendments to the Commons bill. The bill was to re-establish some environmental regulation that was limited in a 2012 amendment led by the Conservative Party of Canada. Much of Conservative criticism of the Liberal, government sponsored bill was that the need for increases in regulatory complexity was not substantial, with one of the most notable critics being Todd Doherty. The New Democrats and Greens both supported the bill in debate at the 2nd reading stage, with the NDP being particularly motivated by changes respecting Pacific Salmon and Indigenous Knowledge.

In a sitting, most Senate amendments were agreed to by the Commons, and addressed, shark finning, definitions of habitat, and language regarding Indigenous Rights.

There was not a recorded vote on third reading. 

Submissions to the Commons on the topic garnered 57 briefs, and the Commons Committee on Fisheries and Oceans invited 48 witnesses to testify. Stakeholders that presented included First Nations Groups, provincial hydroelectric generation authorities, private citizens, municipal associations, conservation groups, fishers, and fishing industry groups.

Cod Moratorium 
The Atlantic cod moratorium was exercised by the federal government via the Act, causing protests and eventual widespread stagnation and population decline in Newfoundland and Labrador.

Mi’kmaw lobster dispute 
In the wake of the Marshall decision, the Department of Fisheries and Oceans was obligated by the courts to promulgate regulations on how Mi'kmaw communities could fish to provide for themselves a "moderate livelihood". The government was slow to implement this 1999 decision, and by 2021, tensions over this had risen. When Mi'kmaw fishermen began setting down traps before the government had established regulations as a form of protest against the inertia and slow pace, conflict arose when government officials confiscated traps. This further led to conflicts between Mi'kmaw communities who intended to exercise their fishing treaty rights and local non-Mi'kmaw fishers who had anger over special privileges and concern about the health of fisheries as Mi'kmaw were able to harvest at a commercial level outside of the normal fishing season, with property damage against property owned by Mi'kmaw.

Pacific Herring dispute 
There have been disputes as to the proper amount of allowable catch in Pacific Herring industries to be able to sustain the fish stock.

2012 Reforms 
In 2012, reforms to the Fisheries Act by the Harper government were controversial, including placing a reduced importance on habitat conservation and ecology, and making it easier to construct pipelines.The government acknowledged potential environmental costs but highlighted its important role in balancing those costs with economic benefits. In general, the act's revisions shifted focus away from punishing companies for degradation of fish habitat to punishment only in the cases of serious harms to fish themselves, a standard less likely to happen and more difficult to prove

Department of Fisheries Conflict of Interest 
Concerns have been raised and it remains an active debate as to whether there is a conflict of interest to have the minister responsible for the well-being of the fisheries industry to be the same minister responsible for preservation of coastal environment and fish habitat. The government contends that healthy ecosystems are also good for fishing prospects, and so the interests are aligned, not in conflict. Opponents contend there is already evidence of conflict causing changes in policy, that the expert opinion in the Cohen Commission highlighted the issue before, and that the government seemed to grant many exemptions to the normal critical level that would normally trigger dramatic restrictions on fishing.

References 

Law of Canada
Fisheries law